A merchant vessel flies a flag, typically at its stern. This flag indicates the legal jurisdiction to which it is subject. For example, a vessel may fly this flag of the Greece; in this case the authority responsible for enforcing maritime regulations would be the Flag Administration of Greece.

Law of the sea